Happy Ending is a 2014 Indian Hindi-language romantic comedy film written and directed by Raj Nidimoru and Krishna D.K. The film is produced by Saif Ali Khan, Dinesh Vijan and Sunil Lulla under Illuminati Films and stars Khan, Ileana D'Cruz and Govinda in the lead roles. The theatrical trailer launched on 10 October 2014.

Plot
Writer Yudi (Saif Ali Khan) wrote a hit book five and a half years ago and is still living life king-size in Los Angeles, enjoying fame and affairs, avoiding commitment, doing no work, partying with his miserably married friend Montu (Ranvir Shorey) or having conversations with his fat, bearded inner voice brother Yogi (also Saif). Suddenly, Yudi's money runs out and his publishers dump him for hit romance novelist Aanchal (Ileana D'Cruz), visiting from Mumbai.

The only work Yudi now gets is from Bollywood single-screen superstar Armaan (Govinda) who insists he copies Hollywood films and writes a multiplex-style romedy, a mix of romance and comedy. Meanwhile, Yudi's dentist and once-girlfriend Vishakha (Kalki Koechlin) is pursuing him obsessively, even loading videos of him singing in the shower on her laptop, forcing Yudi and Montu to break into her home when she's away. On top of this, Yudi's got severe writer's block, stopping him from finishing any work.

Running away from it all, Yudi tries to charm Aanchal but she's commitment-averse too. However, she gradually warms up to him, escorting him to Armaan's party, trying to help Yudi write, even agreeing to take a road trip with him to her book reading in San Francisco.

Eventually reaching San Francisco, the couple is forced to share a hotel room – and agreeing to keep it simple and commitment-free, they end up making love. Their relationship grows funnier – on Aanchal's last night in LA, they argue over dinner, Yudi throws her phone into a vase while she douses him with water – but neither expresses anything more than a sense of light fun. It's only when Yudi's ex-girlfriend Divya (Priety Zinta), having argued with her husband and visiting Yudi with her kids, tells him he loves Aanchal that he admits it to himself.

Yudi then races Aanchal's taxi to the airport in a hilarious scene and tells her his feelings, but she expresses her wish to remain friends with him. As she leaves, Yudi is sinks into depression, and then starts to write. Along the way, Vishakha gets engaged to a panic-stricken Yudi by falsely claiming she's pregnant – but then breaks it up, saying she doesn't want him to marry her out of pity.

Armaan, who has meanwhile got himself cosmetic surgery and six-pack abs in LA, is impressed with the 'kick-ass' script Yudi presents him. However, for the script's ending, Yudi goes to Mumbai and sees Aanchal where he tells her they can take it one day at a time – and perhaps live their whole lives together like that. Aanchal smiles and the Happy Ending begins.

Cast
 Saif Ali Khan as Yudi Jaitley and in a cameo appearance as Yogi
 Ileana D'Cruz as Aanchal Reddy
 Kalki Koechlin as Vishakha
 Ranvir Shorey as Montu
 Govinda as Armaan
 Kareena Kapoor Khan in a cameo appearance as June, Yudi's girlfriend
 Preity Zinta in a cameo appearance as Divya, Yudi's ex-girlfriend
 Rahul Nath as Gary
 Shivani Tanksale as Gauri

Production
Some parts of the film were shot in Ann Arbor, Michigan.

Saif Ali Khan makes a guest appearance despite playing the lead role, a rare instance in film. Yudi is the leading character and he plays Yogi in the cameo.
Ileana D'Cruz's boyfriend Andrew Kneebone is making a guest appearance although he is not an actor.
Kareena Kapoor Khan and Preity Zinta also make guest appearances in the film.

Soundtrack
The music of the film is composed by the duo Sachin–Jigar while lyrics are penned by Amitabh Bhattacharya, Priya Saraiya and Ashish Pandit. The song "Paaji Tussi Such a Pussy Cat" was released as a single prior to the film's audio launch. The song "Jaise Mera Tu" is a remake of the song "Meher Meher" from the Telugu film D for Dopidi, also composed by Sachin–Jigar.

References

External links
 
 

2010s Hindi-language films
Films about screenwriters
Films shot in Michigan
Indian romantic comedy films
2010s buddy comedy films
Films directed by Raj Nidimoru and Krishna D.K.